Guido Magherini (born 2 July 1951 in Florence) is an Italian former footballer who played as a midfielder. He played 4 seasons (16 games without scoring) in Serie A for Lazio and A.C. Milan, and made nearly 200 appearances in Serie B. He represented Italy at under-21 level.

His playing career ended with a three-and-a-half-year ban from football received for his involvement in the Totonero 1980 match-fixing scandal. Later, as manager of Rondinella Calcio, he was involved in another match-fixing scandal, Totonero 1986, for which he received a five-year ban from football.

Honours
Milan
 Coppa Italia winner: 1972–73.
 European Cup Winners' Cup winner: 1972–73.

References

1951 births
Living people
Italian footballers
Italy under-21 international footballers
Association football midfielders
A.C. Milan players
S.S. Lazio players
S.S. Arezzo players
Palermo F.C. players
Ascoli Calcio 1898 F.C. players
Cagliari Calcio players
Italian football managers
Serie A players
Serie B players